Anoctamin 5 (ANO5) is a protein that in humans is encoded by the ANO5 gene.

Function 
The ANO5 gene provides instructions for making a protein called anoctamin-5. While the specific function of this protein is not well understood, it belongs to a family of proteins, called anoctamins, that act as chloride channels. Chloride channels, which transport negatively charged chlorine atoms (chloride ions) in and out of cells, play a key role in a cell's ability to generate and transmit electrical signals. Most anoctamin proteins function as chloride channels that are turned on (activated) in the presence of positively charged calcium atoms (calcium ions); these channels are known as calcium-activated chloride channels. The mechanism for this calcium activation is unclear. Anoctamin proteins are also involved in maintaining the membrane that surrounds cells and repairing the membrane if damaged.

The anoctamin-5 protein is most abundant in muscles used for movement (skeletal muscles). For the body to move normally, skeletal muscles must tense (contract) and relax in a coordinated way. The regulation of chloride flow within muscle cells plays a role in controlling muscle contraction and relaxation.

The anoctamin-5 protein is also found in other cells including heart (cardiac) muscle cells and bone cells. The anoctamin-5 protein may be important for the development of muscle and bone before birth.

Diseases associated with ANO5 mutations
Limb Girdle Muscular Dystrophy 2L (LGMD2L) and Miyoshi Distal Myopathy 3 (MMD3)
These forms of muscular dystrophy are inherited in an autosomal recessive pattern, meaning that to be affected a person must have mutations on both copies of the gene, and males and females are equally likely to be affected.
Clinically, LGMD2L and MMD3 were considered different diseases  before ANO5 was identified as the responsible gene; LGMD was used to describe initial weakness in proximal muscles (near the center of the body) while MMD to describe initial weakness in distal muscles.

Typical Symptoms

Other names for this gene
 ANO5_HUMAN
 anoctamin-5
 GDD1
 gnathodiaphyseal dysplasia 1 protein
 integral membrane protein GDD1
 LGMD2L
 TMEM16E
 transmembrane protein 16E

Chromosal location
 Cytogenetic location: 11p14.3, which is the short (p) arm of chromosome 11 at position 14.3
 Molecular location: base pairs 22,192,485 to 22,283,367 on chromosome 11 (Homo sapiens Annotation Release 109, GRCh38.p12) (NCBI)

Credit: Genome Decoration Page/NCBI

References

Further reading

External links 
LGMD2L Foundation
Myonexus Therapeudics

Novel ANO5 KO mouse provides new insight into LGMD2L pathogenesis
wolframalpha ano5

Proteins